KDFH (95.9 FM) was a radio station licensed to Big Sur, California. The station served the Monterey and Santa Cruz areas.

History
In June 2016, Mount Wilson Broadcasting donated KMZT-FM's 95.9 frequency to the University of Southern California. The 95.9 frequency would become part of USC's classical music radio network. Mount Wilson FM Broadcasting retained the KMZT-FM call letters. On August 26, 2016, KMZT-FM changed their call letters to KDFH and on August 31, 2016, it switched to a simulcast of KDFC in San Francisco.

At the licensee's request, KDFH's license was cancelled on August 1, 2017.

References

External links

DFH
Defunct radio stations in the United States
Radio stations established in 2012
2012 establishments in California
Radio stations disestablished in 2017
2017 disestablishments in California
University of Southern California
DFH